Halvor Ramel Smith (born 4 February 1960) is a Norwegian sailor. He was born in Oslo and represented the Royal Norwegian Yacht Club. He participated at the 1984 Summer Olympics in Los Angeles, where he placed 17th in the multihull class, together with Per Ferskaug.

References

1960 births
Living people
Sportspeople from Oslo
Norwegian male sailors (sport)
Olympic sailors of Norway
Sailors at the 1984 Summer Olympics – Tornado